Chapter II of the Constitution of Australia establishes the executive branch of the Government of Australia. It provides for the exercise of executive power by the Governor-General advised by a Federal Executive Council.

Sections

Section 61: Executive power

Section 61 vests the executive power of the Commonwealth in the monarch of Australia, and establishes the Governor-General as being able to exercise this power on behalf of the monarch as their representative. In practice, the Governor-General only exercises this power on the advice of the Federal Executive Council which he or she presides over.

Section 62: Federal Executive Council

Section 62 establishes the Federal Executive Council which advises the Governor-General. In practice the Governor-General is bound by convention to follow this advice, and although he or she is described as having the power to choose the members of the Federal Executive Council, generally all parliamentarians who are appointed a ministerial portfolio automatically become members and remain so for life.

Section 63: Provisions referring to Governor-General

Section 64: Ministers of State

Section 65: Numbers of Ministers

Section 66: Salaries of Ministers

Section 67: Appointment of civil servants

Section 68: Command of naval and military forces

Section 68 vests command of the Australian Defence Force in the Governor-General. In practice this role is limited to ceremonial duties, including attending military parades and services, and appointing the Chiefs of the Defence Force, Army, Navy, and Air Force, which (along with all decisions made by the Governor-General in his or her capacity as Commander-in-Chief) is done on the advice of the Federal Executive Council. Actual command of the armed forces is wielded by the Minister for Defence, who is responsible for defence policy, and the Chief of the Defence Force, who is responsible for the administration and operation of the military.

Section 69: Transfer of certain departments

Section 70: Certain powers of Governors to vest in Governor-General

References

External links

Commonwealth of Australia Constitution Act: Chapter II – The Executive Government

Australian constitutional law